John Sherwin may refer to:

 John C. Sherwin, American politician
John Sherwin (journalist) for Sky News Ireland
John Sherwin (MP) (c.1527–1589), MP for Chichester (UK Parliament constituency)